Cymatura fasciata is a species of beetle in the family Cerambycidae. It was described by Félix Édouard Guérin-Méneville in 1849. It has a wide distribution in Africa.

References

Xylorhizini
Beetles described in 1849